The Escorts, also known as the Legendary Escorts, were an American R&B group formed in Rahway State Prison in 1970.

Background 
While incarcerated at Trenton State Prison in 1968, founding member Reginald Prophet Haynes began practicing doo-wop singing with fellow prisoners. In 1970, after members of the group were transferred to Rahway State Prison, they first performed as the Escorts at a prison talent show, where they caught the attention of Motown producer George Kerr.

In 1973, Kerr returned to Rahway with a mobile recording unit, resulting in the Escorts' debut album, All We Need is Another Chance, followed by Three Down, Four to Go (1974).

Legacy 
The Escorts have been sampled by hip hop artists including J Dilla and Public Enemy. They are the subject of Corbett Jones' 2017 documentary film, All We Need Is Another Chance, and a version of the group has continued to tour as the Legendary Escorts. Jill Scott used the track from, "Look Over Your Shoulder", for her song, "Family Reunion" on her 2004 album, Beautifully Human.

Original members 
Reginald "Prophet" Haynes (March 24, 1949 – July 11, 2020)
Lawrence Franklin
Robert Arrington
William Dugger
Stephen Carter
Frank Heard
Marion Murphy

Discography

Albums 
 1973: All We Need Is Another Chance No. 41 U.S. R&B
 1974: Three Down, Four to Go No. 57 U.S. R&B

Singles

See also 
 Lifers Group – a hip hop group formed at Rahway State Prison (now  East Jersey State Prison) in 1991

References

External links
Jill Scott - Family Reunion 2004 @ YouTube
Look Over Your Shoulder ~ YouTube

Musical groups from New Jersey
Prison music
American rhythm and blues musical groups
African-American musical groups